Kaib, KaiB, or KAIB may refer to:
 KAIB (FM), one of the radio stations of Air 1
 KaiB, a gene
 KAI Bandara, an Indonesian railway operator
 Korea Aviation Accident Investigation Board
 Rami Kaib (born 1997), Swedish footballer